Mark Ross Williams (born 19 October 1981) is an English retired professional footballer who played as a right winger in the Football League for Brentford. After his release in 2003, he played for Barnet and in Singapore for Woodlands Wellington, before retiring due to a back injury in 2005.

Personal life 
Williams is a Brentford supporter. After his retirement from football, Williams worked as a personal trainer and as of 2011, was running a kitchen design business. As of 2018, he was working in sales.

Career statistics

References

External links

1981 births
Living people
Sportspeople from Chatham, Kent
Footballers from Kent
English footballers
Association football wingers
Brentford F.C. players
Barnet F.C. players
English Football League players
Woodlands Wellington FC players
English expatriate footballers
English expatriate sportspeople in Singapore
Singapore Premier League players